Afroedura is a genus of African geckos, lizards in the family Gekkonidae. Member species are collectively known as rock geckos or flat geckos.

In 2021, four new species of Afroedura were described from Angola.

Species
The genus Afroedura contains 34 recognized species.

Afroedura africana  
Afroedura amatolica  – Amatola rock gecko
Afroedura bogerti  – Bogert's rock gecko 
Afroedura broadleyi  – Broadley's rock gecko
Afroedura donveae  – Iona flat gecko
Afroedura gorongosa 
Afroedura granitica  – granite rock gecko
Afroedura haackei  – Haacke's rock gecko
Afroedura halli  
Afroedura hawequensis  – Cape rock gecko, Hawequa flat gecko 
Afroedura karroica  
Afroedura langi 
Afroedura leoloensis  – Leolo rock gecko
Afroedura loveridgei  – Loveridge's rock gecko
Afroedura major  
Afroedura maripi  – Maripi rock gecko
Afroedura marleyi  – Marley's rock gecko, Marley's flat gecko 
Afroedura multiporis  – Multipored rock gecko, Woodbush flat gecko
Afroedura namaquensis  – Namaqua rock gecko, Namaqua flat gecko
Afroedura nivaria  – Drakensberg rock gecko, Drakensberg flat gecko
Afroedura otjihipa  – Otjihipa flat gecko
Afroedura pienaari  – Pienaar's rock gecko
Afroedura pondolia  – Pondo rock gecko,  Pondo flat gecko
Afroedura pongola  – Pongola rock gecko
Afroedura praedicta  – Serra da Neve flat gecko
Afroedura pundomontana  – Bocoio flat gecko
Afroedura rondavelica  – Rondavels rock gecko
Afroedura rupestris 
Afroedura tembulica  – Queenstown rock gecko, Tembu flat gecko
Afroedura tirasensis 
Afroedura transvaalica  – Transvaal rock gecko, Transvaal flat gecko
Afroedura vazpintorum  – Coastal flat gecko
Afroedura waterbergensis  – Waterberg rock gecko
Afroedura wulfhaackei  – Angolan flat gecko

Nota bene: A binomial authority in parentheses indicates that the species was originally described in a genus other than Afroedura.

References

Further reading
Branch, Bill (2004). Field Guide to Snakes and other Reptiles of Southern Africa. Third Revised edition, Second impression. Sanibel Island, Florida: Ralph Curtis Books. 399 pp. . (Genus Afroedura, p. 231).
Loveridge A (1944). "New geckos of the genera Afroedura, new genus, and Pachydactylus from Angola". American Museum Novitates (1254): 1-4. (Afroedura, new genus, p. 1).

 
Lizard genera
Taxa named by Arthur Loveridge